The 2019 European Netball Championship were held in Belfast from 27-29 September 2019.

Results
 Results and match replays available here

Table

Matches

Final standings

See also
 European Netball Championship
 Netball Europe

References

2019 in netball
2019
Netball
2019 in English netball
2019 in Welsh women's sport
2019 in Northern Ireland sport
2019 in Irish women's sport
International netball competitions hosted by the United Kingdom
International sports competitions hosted by Northern Ireland
September 2019 sports events in the United Kingdom
Netball in Northern Ireland